Kamrieng may refer to: 

Kamrieng District, a district in Cambodia
Kamrieng (commune), a commune in the Kamrieng District of Cambodia